The Fatwa Girl is a 2011 novel by Pakistani author Akbar Agha.  It is a story of love and innocence lost in the Pakistan of today, where modernity is symbolized by the possession of a nuclear bomb, but where religious hatreds are as old as time itself.

Plot summary 

Amor vincit omnia — love conquers all, but in a land which has been conquered from the Moguls to the British and now where the Taliban and fundamentalists strive for hegemony, a young man named Omar faces a battle in winning the hand of the girl he loves. It is in this milieu that two lovers try to forge not only a relationship for themselves but also a society where peace and sanity prevail, battling the forces of hatred and sectarianism that threaten to tear their worlds — and a nation — apart.

At once a quirky exploration of a society on edge and a tender tale of shattered innocence, The Fatwa Girl,  reveals a deep understanding of the human heart and its often mysterious attachments.

External links 
 Hachette page for the book.
The Times of India: The Fatwa Girl -- The girl who dies pleading a fatwa.
 Yahoo! News India: Ranked #7 on Bestseller's list by IANS—Indo-Asian News Service, Nov 17, 2011.
 The Hindu, India: Featured on The Hindu Best Sellers List, January 24, 2012.

References 

2011 novels
Pakistani novels
Political novels
Novels set in Pakistan
Hachette (publisher) books
2011 debut novels